Deltophora distinctella is a moth of the family Gelechiidae. It is found in India.

The length of the forewings is 5.5-6.5 mm. The forewings are light grey-brown with distinct dark brown markings. Adults have been recorded on wing from January to March and September to November.

References

Moths described in 1979
Deltophora
Taxa named by Klaus Sattler